O. Panneerselvam assumed the office after previous Chief  Minister Jayalalithaa was forced to resign in the year 2014. O. Panneerselvam her trusted aide assumed the office then resigned after her return on 23 May 2015.

Cabinet ministers

References 

All India Anna Dravida Munnetra Kazhagam
P
2010s in Tamil Nadu
2014 establishments in Tamil Nadu
Cabinets established in 2014
2014 in Indian politics